Don't Give It Up may refer to:

 "Don't Give It Up" (Siobhán Donaghy song)
 "Don't Give It Up" (Lemar song)
 "Don't Give It Up" (Robbie Patton song)
 "Don't Give It Up", a song by Emma Paki from Oxygen of Love
 "Don't Give It Up", a song by Six60